My Love Is Rotten to the Core is Tim Hecker's third release. It was released on June 25, 2002 by Substractif, a sub-label of Alien8 Recordings. The record is a concept album of sorts, being composed of spliced and sampled elements of Van Halen songs and interviews, constructed into a mini-narrative of the band's dissolution and breakup, accompanied by Hecker's compositions of ambience and noise.

The title is taken from a line off Van Halen's major hit "Ain't Talkin' 'Bout Love".

Track listing

External links
Alien8 Recordings's page for My Love Is Rotten to the Core

2002 albums
Tim Hecker albums
Alien8 Recordings albums